Borzelan or Borzolan may refer to:
 Borzelan-e Olya
 Borzelan-e Sofla